Tanya Lindenmuth (born May 25, 1979) is an American cyclist. She competed at the 2000 Summer Olympics in Sydney, in the women's sprint. Lindenmuth was born in Allentown, Pennsylvania.

References

1979 births
Living people
American female cyclists
Olympic cyclists of the United States
Cyclists at the 2000 Summer Olympics
Pan American Games medalists in cycling
Pan American Games gold medalists for the United States
Cyclists at the 2003 Pan American Games
Medalists at the 2003 Pan American Games
21st-century American women